Dr. Constantin Rădulescu Stadium, informally also known as CFR Cluj Stadium, is a football-only stadium in the Gruia district, Cluj-Napoca, Romania and is home ground of CFR Cluj. The stadium is named after Constantin Rădulescu (1924–2001), a former player, coach and club doctor.

History
The stadium was originally built in 1973. Before 2004 it had a capacity of about 10,000 seats, hosting the home games of CFR Cluj, mostly in the second and third divisions of the Romanian football.

As CFR Cluj qualified for the Champions League group stage in 2008, the stadium was expanded. The expansion was designed by Dico și Țigănaș, built by Transilvania Construction, and completed in September 2008, increasing the capacity to 23,500 seats. There are also plans for further expansions.

The stadium was inaugurated with an international game between CFR Cluj and Braga, a game that CFR Cluj won with 3–1.

On 6 September 2008, Romania played Lithuania in a 2010 FIFA World Cup qualifier. It was the first match of the Romania national team in Cluj-Napoca after 85 years, ending in a shocking and ”shameful”, as described by the audience, 3-0 victory for Lithuania.

Events

Association football

Association football

Gallery

See also
List of football stadiums in Romania

References

External links
Stadium seat map

Football venues in Romania
Buildings and structures in Cluj-Napoca
CFR Cluj
Sports venues in Cluj-Napoca